The 1991–92 Slovenian First League of Handball (known also as the Superliga) was the first season of the 1. A liga, Slovenia's premier Handball league.

Teams for the 1991–92 season

Final table

Pld - Played; W - Won; L - Lost; PF - Points for; PA - Points against; Diff - Difference; Pts - Points.

External links
 Slovenian Handball Federaration 

 
1991–92 domestic handball leagues
Handball competitions in Slovenia
1991 in Slovenian sport
1992 in Slovenian sport